The Wetherby Gymnasium is a 4,000-seat multi-purpose arena at Morehead State University (MSU) in Morehead, Kentucky. It is named for former Kentucky Governor Lawrence Wetherby and was built in 1956.

Wetherby Gymnasium is the home of MSU's Eagles volleyball teams Prior to the Ellis Johnson Arena opening in 1981, it also hosted the MSU basketball team.

References

Morehead State Eagles
Indoor arenas in Kentucky
College volleyball venues in the United States
Sports venues in Kentucky
Defunct college basketball venues in the United States
Buildings and structures in Rowan County, Kentucky
1956 establishments in Kentucky
Sports venues completed in 1956